The Second Italo-Senussi War, also referred to as the Pacification of Libya, was a conflict that occurred during the Italian colonization of Libya between Italian military forces (composed mainly of colonial troops from Libya, Eritrea, and Somalia) and indigenous rebels associated with the Senussi Order. The war lasted from 1923 until 1932, when the principal Senussi leader, Omar al-Mukhtar, was captured and executed.
 Fighting took place in all three of Libya's provinces (Tripolitania, Fezzan, and Cyrenaica), but was most intense and prolonged in the mountainous Jebel Akhdar region of Cyrenaica. The war led to the mass deaths of the indigenous people of Cyrenaica, totalling one quarter of the region's population of 225,000. Italian war crimes included the use of chemical weapons, execution of surrendering combatants, and the mass killing of civilians, while the Senussis were accused of torture and mutilation of captured Italians and refusal to take prisoners since the late 1910s. Italian authorities forcibly expelled 100,000 Bedouin Cyrenaicans, half the population of Cyrenaica, from their settlements, many of which were then given to Italian settlers.

Background
Italy had seized military control of Libya from the Ottoman Empire during the Italo-Turkish War in 1912, but the new colony had swiftly revolted, transferring large swaths of territory to local Libyan rule. Conflict between Italy and the Senussis  a Muslim political-religious tariqa based in Libya  erupted into major violence during World War I, when Senussis in Libya began collaborating with the Ottomans against Italian troops. The Libyan Senussis also escalated the conflict by attacking British forces stationed in Egypt. Conflict between the British and the Senussis continued until 1917.

In 1917, an exhausted Italy signed the Treaty of Acroma, which acknowledged the effective independence of Libya from Italian control. In 1918, Tripolitanian rebels founded the Tripolitanian Republic, though the rest of the country remained under nominal Italian rule. Local resistance against Italy continued, such that by 1920, the Italian government was forced to recognize Senussi leader Sayid Idris as Emir of Cyrenaica and grant him autonomy. In 1922, Tripolitanian leaders offered Idris the position of Emir of Tripolitania; however, before Idris could accept the position, the new Italian government of Benito Mussolini initiated a campaign of reconquest.

Since 1911, claims had been made of killings of Italian soldiers and civilians by Ottoman and local Muslim guerrillas, such as a slaughter in Sciara Sciat:
	

Reports of these killings led to cries for retaliation and revenge in Italy, and in the early 1920s the rise to power of Benito Mussolini, leader of the National Fascist Party, as Prime Minister of Italy led to a much more aggressive approach to foreign policy. Given the importance that the Fascists gave to Libya as part of a new Italian Empire, this incident served as a useful pretext for large-scale military action to reclaim it.

War
The war began with Italian forces rapidly occupying the Sirte desert separating Tripolitania from Cyrenaica. Using aircraft, motor transport, and good logistical organization, the Italians were able to occupy  of territory in five months, cutting off the physical connection formerly held by the rebels between Cyrenaica and Tripolitania. By late 1928, the Italians had taken control of Ghibla, and its tribes were disarmed.

From 1923 to 1924, Italian troops regained all territory north of the Ghadames-Mizda-Beni Ulid region, with four-fifths of the estimated population of Tripolitania and Fezzan within the Italian area. In this period they also regained the northern lowlands of Cyrenaica, but attempts to occupy the forested hills of Jebel Akhtar were met with strong guerrilla resistance, led by Senussi sheikh Omar Mukhtar.

Attempted negotiations between Italy and Omar Mukhtar broke down and Italy then planned for the complete conquest of Libya. In 1930, Italian forces conquered Fezzan and raised the Italian flag in Tummo, the southernmost region of Fezzan. On 20 June 1930, Pietro Badoglio wrote to General Graziani: "As for overall strategy, it is necessary to create a significant and clear separation between the controlled population and the rebel formations. I do not hide the significance and seriousness of this measure, which might be the ruin of the subdued population...But now the course has been set, and we must carry it out to the end, even if the entire population of Cyrenaica must perish". By 1931, well over half the population of Cyrenaica were confined to 15 concentration camps where many died as result of overcrowding in combination with a lack of water, food and medicine while Badoglio had the Air Force use chemical warfare against the Bedouin rebels in the desert.

12,000 Cyrenaicans were executed in 1931 and all the nomadic peoples of northern Cyrenaica were forcefully removed from the region and relocated to huge concentration camps in the Cyrenaican lowlands. Italian military authorities carried out the forced migration and deportation of the entire population of Jebel Akhdar in Cyrenaica, resulting in 100,000 Bedouins, half the population of Cyrenaica, being expelled from their settlements. These 100,000 people, mostly women, children, and the elderly, were forced by Italian authorities to march across the desert to a series of barbed-wire concentration camp compounds erected near Benghazi, while stragglers who could not keep up with the march were shot by Italian authorities. The camps held only rudimentary medical services, with the camps of Soluch and Sisi Ahmed el Magrun with 33,000 internees each having only one doctor between them. Typhus and other diseases spread rapidly in the camps as the people were physically weakened due to meagre food rations and forced labour. By the time the camps closed in September 1933, 40,000 of the 100,000 total internees had already died in the camps.

To close rebel supply routes from Egypt, the Italians constructed a  barbed wire fence on the border with Egypt that was patrolled by armoured cars and aircraft. The Italians persecuted the Senussi Order; zawias and mosques were closed, Senussi practices were forbidden, Senussi estates were confiscated, and preparations were made for Italian conquest of the Kufra Oasis, the last stronghold of the Senussi in Libya. In 1931, Italian forces seized Kufra where Senussi refugees were bombed and strafed by Italian aircraft as they fled into the desert. Mukhtar was captured by the Italians in 1931, followed by a court martial and his public execution by hanging at Suluq.

Mukhtar's death effectively ended the resistance, and in January 1932, Badoglio proclaimed the end of the campaign. Mukhtar's aides were executed later that year on 24 September 1932.

Takeover of Kufra
The Frankfurter Zeitung reporter and author Muhammad Asad interviewed a man from Kufra after its seizure by the Italians in his book The Road to Mecca.

Repression focus on the non-combatant population 
After the failed negotiations with Omar Mukhtar, the Italian occupying power renewed its repressive policy against the Cyrenean resistance with arrests and shootings in November 1929. Since Badoglio had not gotten a grip on the guerrillas in Cyrenaica until 1930, Mussolini appointed General Rodolfo Graziani as the new lieutenant governor of Cyrenaica at the suggestion of Colonial Minister Emilio De Bono. Graziani, notorious for his firmness in fascist principles, had just completed the conquest of Fessan and had made a name for himself as the "butcher of Fessan" in years of guerrilla warfare. Literally interpreting the regime's slogans, he understood the pacification of the country as the submission of “barbarians” to “Romans”. On 27 March 1930 Graziani moved into the Governor's Palace of Benghazi. Colonial Minister De Bono regarded an escalation of violence as inevitable for the “pacification” of the region and on 10 January 1930, in a telegram to Badoglio, suggested the establishment of concentration camps (""campi di concentramento"") for the first time. Badoglio had also come to the conclusion that the "rebels" could not be permanently subjugated to the counter-guerrilla with the methods they had previously used. From then on, both appeared as pioneers and strategists in genocidal warfare within the framework defined by Mussolini, while Graziani fulfilled the role of executor.

The Italians had originally divided the Libyan population into two groups, on the one hand the armed resistance "rebels", on the other hand the non-fighting, subjugated population (sottomessi), which had surrendered in the eyes of the colonial administration. In doing so, they wanted to undermine the unity of the people and act more efficiently against the armed fighters. Now, after the failure of the military offensive against the resistance movement, the Italians changed their attitude. It became clear that a clear distinction between the two groups was not possible, since the resistance movement was supported both materially and morally by the "subject population". The civilians paid taxes, donated weapons, clothing or food to Omar Mukhtar's desert warriors or made horses available to them. Since the non-combatant population ensured the reproductive conditions of the adwar system and formed the social basis of the resistance movement, they were now classified as dangerous potential by the colonial administration.

During the spring and summer of 1930, Graziani systematically targeted the social environment of the guerrillas. As a first measure, he had the Islamic cultural centers (zâwiyas) closed. The Koran scholars who led them were captured and deported to the Italian prison island of Ustica. Their lands were expropriated; Hundreds of houses and 70,000 hectares of prime land including the cattle on them changed hands. In addition, Graziani ordered the complete disarmament of the non-combatant population as well as draconian punishments in the event of civilians cooperating with Omar Mukhtar's adwar combat groups. Anyone who owned a weapon or provided support to the Senussi Order had to face execution. In the colonial administration, Graziani began a purge of Arab employees who were accused of treason. He had the battalions of Libyan colonial troops, which in the past often indirectly supported Omar Mukhtar's resistance, disbanded. All forms of trade with Egypt were banned in order to control the smuggling of goods to the insurgents. Last but not least, Graziani began expanding a road network in the Jebel Akhdar Mountains - a project that none of his predecessors had previously carried out. Simultaneously with these measures, a mass exodus of the Cyrenean population to the surrounding countries began.

In a carefully prepared and coordinated operation with ten differently composed columns, Graziani tried from 16 June 1930, to encircle and destroy the units of Omar Mukhtar. However, the Senussi  adwar  combat units were again informed in good time by the local population and by deserters from Italian colonial troops. By dividing them into smaller groups, they were able to escape the Italian columns with slight losses.

Deportations and death marches 

At this point, Badoglio took the initiative again and emphatically proposed a new dimension of repressive measures: By deporting the people of the Jabal-Achdar Mountains, he literally wanted to create an empty space around the adwar combat units. On 20 June 1930 he wrote to Graziani in a letter:

After a meeting with Graziani, Marshal Badoglio ordered the complete evacuation of Jabal Achdar on 25 June 1930. Three days later, the Italian army, together with Eritrean colonial troops and Libyan collaborators, began to round up the population and their cattle. Italian archival documents date the beginning of the action to the summer of 1930. The overwhelming majority of Libyan contemporary witnesses, however, agree that the first such arrests were made in autumn 1929. Specifically, Badolgio's order resulted in the forced relocation of 100,000 to 110,000 people and their internment in concentration camps - about half of the total population of Cyrenaica. While only one report of the deportation of a single tribe is available in Italian archives, the oral history of the victims reports in detail on the extent of the action, which covered the entire area from the Marmarica region on the Egyptian border in the east to the Syrte desert in the West concerned. However, the urban population on the coast and residents of the oases inland were not affected. From the assembly points, those who had been rounded up had to set off in columns on foot or by camels, some were also deported from the coast by ships. Such a deportation had hardly any role models in the colonial history of Africa and even put Graziani's rabid counter-guerrilla methods in the shade.

Guarded by mainly Eritrean colonial troops, the entire population was forced, together with their belongings and cattle, on death marches that sometimes led over hundreds of kilometers for 20 weeks. Anyone who was picked up on the Jabal Achdar after the forced evacuation had to expect an immediate execution. In the summer heat, a considerable number of the deportees did not survive the rigors of the marches, especially children and the elderly. Anyone who fell to the ground exhausted and could no longer go on was shot by the guards. The high death rate was a deliberate consequence of the marches, and the land that was freed was again passed into the hands of colonists. Of the 600,000 camels, horses, sheep, goats and cattle that were taken on the way, only about 100,000 arrived. The survivors refer to the deportation in Arabic as al-Rihlan ("path of tears").

War crimes
Specific war crimes committed by the Italian armed forces against civilians include deliberate bombing of civilians, killing unarmed children, women, and the elderly, rape and disembowelment of women, throwing prisoners out of aircraft to their death and running over others with tanks, regular daily executions of civilians in some areas, and bombing tribal villages with mustard gas bombs beginning in 1930.

Aftermath
In 2008, Italy and Libya reached agreement on a document compensating Libya for damages caused by Italian colonial rule. Muammar Gaddafi, Libya's ruler at the time, attended the signing ceremony wearing a historical photograph on his uniform that showed Cyrenaican rebel leader Omar Mukhtar in chains after being captured by Italian authorities during the war. At the ceremony, Italian Prime Minister Silvio Berlusconi declared: "In this historic document, Italy apologizes for its killing, destruction and repression of the Libyan people during the period of colonial rule." He went on to say that this was a "complete and moral acknowledgement of the damage inflicted on Libya by Italy during the colonial era."

These declarations received harsh criticism from the Associazione Rifugiati Italiani dalla Libia and from some Italian historians, who felt the agreement was "based on false assumptions created by Gaddafi propaganda".

In popular culture
The 1981 film Lion of the Desert by Moustapha Akkad is about the conflict.

See also
Pacification of Algeria
Battle and massacre at Shar al-Shatt
Italian concentration camps in Libya
Second Italo-Ethiopian War
Italo-Turkish War

References

Sources
 
 
 
 
 
 
 
 

Interwar period
Italian colonisation in Africa
Italian Libya
1920s in Italy
1930s in Italy
1920s in Libya
1930s in Libya
1920s conflicts
1930s conflicts
African resistance to colonialism
Violence against Muslims
Ethnic cleansing in Africa
Genocides in Africa
Mass murder in 1923
Mass murder in 1932
Senussi dynasty
Wars involving Italy